The Alfred P. Sloan Prize is an award given each year, starting in 2003, to a film at the Sundance Film Festival. The prize is given to a feature film that focuses on science or technology as a theme, or depicts a scientist, engineer, or mathematician as a major character.

Each winner is presented with a $20,000 cash award provided by the Alfred P. Sloan Foundation.

Winning films

See also 
Alfred P. Sloan
Sloan Science & Film for all award winners
List of Sundance Film Festival award winners

References

Sundance Film Festival

Alfred P. Sloan Foundation